is the pen name of the lead artist, colorist, and composition designer of the all-female manga-creating team Clamp. Clamp has had a huge impact on the "manga explosion" according to an account in The New York Times in 2006. Their artwork has been characterized as "wispy", "fluid" and "dramatic" which has resonated with both male and female demographic readers of manga. The Tsubasa manga sold more than a million copies in the United States, and television programs based on the concept have been successful as well as DVD spinoffs.

References

External links

Living people
Clamp (manga artists)
1968 births
Japanese women artists
Japanese female comics artists
Manga artists